Shreyas Vasudevareddy Movva (born 4 September 1993) is a Canadian cricketer. In October 2019, he was named as the vice-captain of Canada's squad for the 2019–20 Regional Super50 tournament in the West Indies. He made his List A debut on 8 November 2019, for Canada against the Leeward Islands, in the Regional Super50 tournament.

In October 2021, he was named in Canada's Twenty20 International (T20I) squad for the 2021 ICC Men's T20 World Cup Americas Qualifier tournament in Antigua. He made his Twenty20 International (T20I) debut for Canada against Panama in the Regional Finals of the 2021 ICC Men's T20 World Cup Americas Qualifier tournament on 14 November 2021. In February 2022, he was named in Canada's squad for the 2022 ICC Men's T20 World Cup Global Qualifier A tournament in Oman.

Personal life
Movva is a software engineer by profession. He was born in India and moved to Montreal in 2016 to attend Concordia University. He was the first player from Quebec to be selected for Canada in twelve years.

References

External links
 

1993 births
Living people
Canadian cricketers
Canada Twenty20 International cricketers
Place of birth missing (living people)
Indian emigrants to Canada
Canadian software engineers
Cricketers from Quebec